The 1992 Miller Genuine Draft 500 was the 16th stock car race of the 1992 NASCAR Winston Cup Series season and the 20th iteration of the event. The race was held on Sunday, July 19, 1992, in Long Pond, Pennsylvania, at Pocono Raceway, a 2.5 miles (4.0 km) triangular permanent course. The race took the scheduled 200 laps to complete. Running on a fuel mileage call, owner-driver Darrell Waltrip would manage to conserve fuel for the last 42 laps of the race to take his 82nd career NASCAR Winston Cup Series victory and his first victory of the season. To fill out the top three, Leo Jackson Motorsports driver Harry Gant and owner-driver Alan Kulwicki would finish second and third, respectively.

On lap 150 of the race, driver's championship points leader, Robert Yates Racing driver Davey Allison would be involved in a crash when Darrell Waltrip tapped the left rear of Allison's vehicle, sending him sideways. The car would proceed to lift into the air, resulting in Allison's car flipping 11 times in a fast manner, before eventually landing upside-down, totaling Allison's car. Allison was taken to an Allentown, Pennsylvania hospital, where it was found that he had broken his right collarbone, both bones in his forearm, his right wrist, and had bruised his right eye socket. With the crash, Allison would lose the overall points lead to Bill Elliott.

Background 

The race was held at Pocono International Raceway, which is a three-turn superspeedway located in Long Pond, Pennsylvania. The track hosts two annual NASCAR Sprint Cup Series races, as well as one Xfinity Series and Camping World Truck Series event. Until 2019, the track also hosted an IndyCar Series race.

Pocono International Raceway is one of a very few NASCAR tracks not owned by either Speedway Motorsports, Inc. or International Speedway Corporation. It is operated by the Igdalsky siblings Brandon, Nicholas, and sister Ashley, and cousins Joseph IV and Chase Mattioli, all of whom are third-generation members of the family-owned Mattco Inc, started by Joseph II and Rose Mattioli.

Outside of the NASCAR races, the track is used throughout the year by Sports Car Club of America (SCCA) and motorcycle clubs as well as racing schools and an IndyCar race. The triangular oval also has three separate infield sections of racetrack – North Course, East Course and South Course. Each of these infield sections use a separate portion of the tri-oval to complete the track. During regular non-race weekends, multiple clubs can use the track by running on different infield sections. Also some of the infield sections can be run in either direction, or multiple infield sections can be put together – such as running the North Course and the South Course and using the tri-oval to connect the two.

Entry list 

 (R) denotes rookie driver.

Qualifying 
Qualifying was originally scheduled to be split into two rounds. The first round was scheduled to be held on Friday, July 17, at 3:00 PM EST. However, due to fog, the first round was cancelled, and qualifying was condensed into one round, which was held on Saturday, July 18, at 10:30 AM EST. Each driver would have one lap to set a time. For this specific race, positions 1–40 would be decided on time, and depending on who needed it, a select amount of positions were given to cars who had not otherwise qualified but were high enough in owner's points; up to two provisionals were given. If needed, a past champion who did not qualify on either time or provisionals could use a champion's provisional, adding one more spot to the field.

No drivers would fail to qualify.

Full qualifying results

Race results

Standings after the race 

Drivers' Championship standings

Note: Only the first 10 positions are included for the driver standings.

References 

1992 NASCAR Winston Cup Series
NASCAR races at Pocono Raceway
July 1992 sports events in the United States
1992 in sports in Pennsylvania